This is a bibliography of the works of Jay E. Adams.

Jay Edward Adams (January 30, 1929 – November 14, 2020) was an American Presbyterian author who has written more than 100 books. His books have been translated into 16 languages, and he received his doctorate in preaching.

Baptism

Counseling

 - edition with new publisher of the 1970 classic

 - edition with new publisher of the 1973 classic

Eschatology

Preaching

 - a revised edition of A Consumer's Guide to Preaching above

Other

Notes

Jay E. Adams bibliography
Bibliographies by writer
Bibliographies of American writers
Christian bibliographies